Bukomero is a town in Ssingo County, Kiboga District, in the Central Region of Uganda.

Location
The town is located on the Kampala–Hoima Road, approximately
, southeast of Kiboga, where the district headquarters are located. The coordinates of Bukomero are 0°41'22.0"N, 32°02'20.0"E (Latitude:0.689444; Longitude:32.038889).

Overview
Bukomero is on a relative plateau surrounded by hilly, rocky, infertile, and often bare terrain. Most economic activity takes place in the lower, more accessible, fertile plains. Commercial and administrative activities in the town's central business district, include small scale family shops ("dduukas"), a farmer's market, and a sub-county headquarters. Public service facilities include one public health center, one public elementary school, and one public secondary school. The area is prone to water shortages.

Population
In 2015, the Uganda Bureau of Statistics (UBOS) estimated the population of Bukomero Town Council at 14,500. In 2020, UBOS estimated the town's mid-year population at 16,400. The table below, illustrates the same data in tabular format.

Other considerations
Bukomero is also the headquarters of Bukomero sub-county, one of the nine administrative subdivisions of Kiboga District, comprising seven sub-counties and two town councils.

See also
 Kiboga
 Kibulala, Ssingo
 Kiboga District

References

External links
 Environmental Conservation And Protection In Bukomero Town Council, Kiboga District, Uganda

Populated places in Central Region, Uganda
Cities in the Great Rift Valley
Kiboga District